The following is a chronological list of presidents of the College of the Holy Cross:
 Rev. Thomas F. Mulledy, SJ (1843–1845)
 Rev. James Ryder, SJ (1845–1848)
 Rev. John Early, SJ (1848–1851)
 Rev. Anthony F. Ciampi , SJ (1851–1854)
 Rev. Peter J. Blenkinsop, SJ (1854–1857)
Rev. Anthony F. Ciampi, SJ (1857–1861)
 Rev. James Clark, SJ (1861–1867)
 Rev. Robert W. Brady , SJ (1867–1869)
Rev. Anthony F. Ciampi, SJ (1869–1873)
 Rev. Joseph B. O'Hagan, SJ (1873–1878)
 Rev. Edward D. Boone, SJ (1878–1883)
Rev. Robert W. Brady, SJ (1883–1887)
 Rev. Samuel Cahill, SJ (1887–1889)
 Rev. Michael O'Kane, SJ (1889–1893)
 Rev. Edward A. McGurk, SJ (1893–1895)
 Rev. John F. Lehy, SJ (1895–1901)
 Rev. Joseph F. Hanselman, SJ (1901–1906)
 Rev. Thomas E. Murphy, SJ (1906–1911)
 Rev. Joseph N. Dinand , SJ (1911–1918)
 Rev. James J. Carlin, SJ (1918–1924)
Rev. Joseph N. Dinand, SJ (1924–1927)
 Rev. John M. Fox, SJ (1927–1933)
 Rev. Francis J. Dolan, SJ (1933–1939)
 Rev. Joseph R. N. Maxwell, SJ (1939–1945)
 Rev. William J. Healy (1945–1948)
 Rev. John A. O'Brien(born 1897,died 1963), SJ (served from 1948–1954)
 Rev. William A. Donaghy, SJ (1954–1960)
 Rev. Raymond J. Swords, SJ (1960–1970)
 Rev. John E. Brooks, SJ (1970–1994)
 Rev. Gerard C. Reedy, SJ (1994–1998)
 Dr. Frank Vellaccio, PhD (acting, 1998–2000)
 Rev. Michael C. McFarland, SJ (2000–2012)
 Rev. Philip L. Boroughs, SJ (2012–2021)
Vincent Rougeau (2021-present)

References 

 
Holy Cross, College Of